This is a list of famous Hindu temples in Kerala ordered by district.

Alappuzha

Ernakulam

Idukki

Kannur

Kasaragod

Kollam

Kottayam

Kozhikode

Malappuram

Palakkad

Pathanamthitta

Thiruvananthapuram

Thrissur

Wayanad

Other temples in the district include:
Ammathiruvadi Temple
Guruvayur Temple, Guruvayoor
Kuttumuck Siva Temple, Kuttumuck
Mammiyoor Temple
Shree Rama Temple, Thriprayar
Thanikkudam Bhagavathi Temple, Thanikkudam
Thiruvullakkavu Sree Dharma Sastha Temple
Thottipal Bhagavati Temple, Thottipal
Trikkur Mahadeva Temple, Oorakam
Vilwadrinatha Temple

References 

 
Kerala
Hindu temples
Lists of tourist attractions in Kerala